Roger Thomas Staubach (-; , -; born February 5, 1942), nicknamed "Roger the Dodger", "Captain America", and "Captain Comeback", is an American former professional football player who was a quarterback in the National Football League (NFL) for 11 seasons with the Dallas Cowboys.

He attended the U.S. Naval Academy where he won the 1963 Heisman Trophy, and after graduation he served in the U.S. Navy, including a tour of duty in Vietnam. Staubach joined Dallas in 1969 and played with the club during all 11 seasons of his career. He led the team to the Super Bowl five times, four as the starting quarterback. He led the Cowboys to victories in Super Bowl VI and Super Bowl XII. Staubach was named Most Valuable Player of Super Bowl VI, becoming the first of four players to win both the Heisman Trophy and Super Bowl MVP, along with Jim Plunkett, Marcus Allen, and Desmond Howard. He was named to the Pro Bowl six times during his 11-year NFL career. He was the executive chairman of the Americas region of Jones Lang LaSalle until his retirement in 2018. He is regarded as one of the best quarterbacks of all time.

Early years
Staubach was born in Cincinnati, Ohio, the only child of Elizabeth (née Smyth) and Robert Staubach. He is of partial German descent, and grew up in Silverton, a northeastern suburb of Cincinnati. He was a Boy Scout as a youth, attended St. John the Evangelist Catholic School, and graduated from the Catholic high school Purcell High School in Cincinnati (now named Purcell Marian High School) in 1960.

U.S. Naval Academy
To prepare for his naval career, Staubach spent one year at New Mexico Military Institute in Roswell, where he set a school record for passing yards and scored 18 total touchdowns. Staubach entered the U.S. Naval Academy in 1961, and played quarterback for the Midshipmen. As a third-class midshipman (sophomore) in 1962, he got his first opportunity to play, in the third game of the season, against the University of Minnesota on October 6. He relieved starter Ron Klemick as the Minnesota defense, led by Bobby Bell and Carl Eller, was stifling in its 21–0 victory. Staubach was 0–2 passing and was sacked twice for -24 yards.

A week later, playing against Cornell University, with the offense failing, coach Wayne Hardin decided to put Staubach into the game to see if he could improve the team's offense. He led Navy to six touchdowns, throwing for 99 yards, and two touchdowns while running for 88 yards and another score as Navy won 41–0.

A few weeks later, Staubach started again in the famous Army–Navy game. President John F. Kennedy attended the game, performing the coin toss. Staubach led the team to a 34–14 upset over Army, throwing for two touchdowns and running for another.

In his second class (junior) season of 1963, he won the Heisman Trophy, Maxwell Award, and the Walter Camp Memorial Trophy while leading the Midshipmen to a 9–1 regular season record and a final ranking of No. 2 in the nation. He appeared on the cover of Time in October; he would also have been on the cover of Life magazine's November 29, 1963 issue, but for the assassination of President Kennedy.

On New Year's Day, the Midshipmen lost the national championship to the No. 1 team, the University of Texas, in the 1964 Cotton Bowl. Earlier that season, Staubach led Navy to a 35–14 road victory in its annual rivalry with Notre Dame. Navy did not beat Notre Dame again until 2007, 43 years later.

During three seasons at Navy, Staubach completed 292 of 463 passes with 18 touchdowns and 19 interceptions, while gaining a school-record 4,253 yards of total offense. Staubach is the last player from a military academy to win the Heisman Trophy. As a senior in 1964, he injured his left heel in the opening game victory over Penn State and missed the next four games, and Navy finished the season at 3–6–1.

The Naval Academy retired Staubach's jersey number (12) during his graduation ceremony after his senior season. In 1981, Staubach was enshrined in the College Football Hall of Fame. In 2007, Staubach was ranked No. 9 on ESPN's Top 25 Players In College Football History list.

Statistics

When his collegiate football career ended, Staubach finished his Academy sports career as captain of the Academy's 1965 baseball team.

U.S. Navy officer
During his junior year at the Naval Academy, Staubach's color-blindness was detected and he was commissioned directly into the Supply Corps, which did not necessitate being able to tell the difference between red (port) and green (starboard) lights or to discern the color differences in electrical circuitry.

After graduating from the Naval Academy in June 1965, Staubach could have requested an assignment in the United States, but he chose to volunteer for a one-year tour of duty in South Vietnam. He served as a Supply Corps officer for the Navy at the Chu Lai Base Area until 1967. Staubach supervised 41 enlisted men.

Staubach returned from South Vietnam in September 1967, and spent the rest of his naval career in the United States. He played football on various service teams to prepare for his future career in the National Football League. During his tour at the naval air station in Pensacola, Florida, he quarterbacked the Goshawks, a team consisting of fellow U.S. Navy officers like himself, and played games against college football teams. He had access to the Dallas Cowboys playbook, and the Goshawks defeated many of the college teams they played against.

Professional career
Staubach was a tenth-round "future" selection in the 1964 NFL Draft by the Cowboys. The NFL allowed the Cowboys to draft him one year before his college eligibility was over (because he was four years out of high school), although due to his four-year military commitment, he would not play professionally until 1969 as a 27-year-old rookie. He was also drafted by the Kansas City Chiefs in the 16th round (122nd choice overall) of the 1964 American Football League Draft, also with a future selection.

While still in the Navy during 1968, he went to the Cowboys' rookie camp, using most of his annual military leave. During 1969, Staubach resigned his naval commission just in time to join the Cowboys training camp. The Cowboys won their first NFC title in 1970 with Craig Morton starting at quarterback, but lost to the Baltimore Colts in Super Bowl V, losing by three points on a last-second field goal.

In 1971, Morton began the season as the starter, but after a loss to the New Orleans Saints, Staubach assumed the role. However, in a game against the Chicago Bears during the seventh week of that season, coach Tom Landry alternated Staubach and Morton on each play, sending in the quarterbacks with the play call from the sideline. Dallas gained almost 500 yards of offense but committed seven turnovers that resulted in a 23–19 loss to a mediocre Bears squad that dropped the Cowboys to 4–3 for the season, two games behind the Washington Redskins in the NFC East race.

Staubach assumed the full-time quarterbacking duties in a week-eight victory over the St. Louis Cardinals and led the Cowboys to 10 consecutive victories, including their first Super Bowl victory, 24–3 over the Miami Dolphins in Super Bowl VI in January 1972. He was named the game's MVP, completing 12 out of 19 passes for 119 yards and two touchdowns and rushing for 18 yards. After the season, he negotiated his own contract, a three-year deal at about $75,000 per year.

In 1972, Staubach missed most of the season with a separated shoulder, but he relieved Morton in a divisional playoff against the San Francisco 49ers and threw two touchdown passes in the last 90 seconds to win 30–28. With that performance, he won back his regular job and did not relinquish it again during his career.

Staubach led the Cowboys to a second Super Bowl win in the 1977 season. He threw for 183 yards and a touchdown, with no interceptions, in Dallas' 27–10 victory in Super Bowl XII over the Denver Broncos, led by his former teammate Morton. Staubach also led the Cowboys to appearances in Super Bowl X and Super Bowl XIII, where they lost to the Pittsburgh Steelers both times by a total of eight points.

Staubach's offensive teammates included standout receivers "Bullet" Bob Hayes, Lance Alworth, Drew Pearson, and Golden Richards, tight ends Mike Ditka, Billy Joe Dupree, and Jackie Smith, tackle Rayfield Wright and running backs Robert Newhouse, Calvin Hill, and Tony Dorsett. Dorsett, Hayes, Pearson, and Wright are in the Hall of Fame, as are Alworth, Ditka, and Smith (although those three were all with the Cowboys only at the end of their careers).

In his final NFL season of 1979, Staubach scored career highs in completions (267), passing yards (3,586) and touchdown passes (27), with just 11 interceptions. He retired at the conclusion of the season in order to protect his long-term health, declining the Cowboys' offer for two more seasons. He suffered 20 concussions in his playing career, including six in which he said he was "knocked out". After suffering two concussions in 1979, a doctor at Cornell told Staubach that while his brain tests were fine at the moment, another concussion could have life-altering consequences. He chose to retire and was succeeded as the Cowboys starting quarterback by Danny White.

Overall, Staubach finished his 11 NFL seasons with 1,685 completions for 22,700 yards and 153 touchdowns, with 109 interceptions. He also gained 2,264 rushing yards and scored 21 touchdowns on 410 carries. For regular-season games, he had a .750 winning percentage. Staubach recorded the highest passer rating in the NFL in four seasons (1971, 1973, 1978, 1979) and led the league with 23 touchdown passes in 1973. He was an All-NFC choice five times and selected to play in six Pro Bowls (1971, 1975–1979).

Legacy and accolades
Staubach retired from football in March 1980 with the highest career passer rating in NFL history at the time, 83.4, and was voted into the Pro Football Hall of Fame in 1985. In 1999, he was ranked No. 29 on The Sporting News list of the 100 Greatest Football Players, the second-ranked Cowboy behind Bob Lilly.

Staubach was one of the most famous NFL players of the 1970s. Known as "Roger The Dodger" for his scrambling abilities, "Captain America" as quarterback of America's Team, and also as "Captain Comeback" for his fourth-quarter game-winning heroics, Staubach had a penchant for leading scoring drives which gave the Cowboys improbable victories. He led the Cowboys to 23 game-winning drives (15 comebacks) during the fourth quarter, with 17 of those in the final two minutes or in overtime.

In the television show King of the Hill, Staubach's name has been used for the elementary school in the fictional town of Arlen, Texas.

Staubach's most famous moment was the "Hail Mary pass" in the 1975 playoff game against the Minnesota Vikings. With seconds on the clock and the Cowboys trailing 14–10, Staubach launched a 50-yard pass to wide receiver Drew Pearson, who caught the pass and strode into the end zone for a 17–14 victory. After the game, Staubach said he threw the ball and said a "Hail Mary". Since then, any last-second pass to the end zone in a desperate attempt to score a game-winning or tying touchdown is referred to as a "Hail Mary" pass.

In 1976, Staubach received the Golden Plate Award of the American Academy of Achievement.

Staubach was named The Walter Camp "Man of the Year" in 1983, and was awarded the Davey O'Brien Legends Award in 2001.

In 1996, the U.S. Navy Memorial Foundation awarded Staubach its Lone Sailor Award for his naval service.

On the occasion of the 30th anniversary of Super Bowl VI in 2002, Staubach, accompanied by former President George H. W. Bush, flipped the coin at Super Bowl XXXVI, played at the Louisiana Superdome, where his only other Super Bowl victory took place.

On January 25, 2007, Staubach was named chairman of the North Texas Super Bowl XLV Bid Committee, whose goal was to have the Dallas-Fort Worth Metroplex host the Super Bowl in 2011. On May 23, 2007, the NFL chose Dallas as the host city of Super Bowl XLV.

In 2010, Staubach was named the No. 1 Dallas Cowboy of all time according to a poll conducted by the Dallas Morning News.

In November 2018, Staubach was awarded the Presidential Medal of Freedom by Donald Trump, becoming one of only four recipients associated with American Football to receive the distinction. He was the first player to receive the award, given it at the same time as Minnesota Vikings DT Alan Page. The other two recipients, Earl Blaik and Bear Bryant, were both head coaches.

In 2022, Staubach's alma mater, Purcell Marian High School in Cincinnati, Ohio, announced its new planned athletic complex opening in fall 2023 would be named Staubach Stadium in honor of Staubach.

NFL career statistics

Regular season

Super Bowl

Personal life

Family life
Staubach married his wife Marianne on September 4, 1965. Together they had five children, Jeffrey, Michelle, Amy, Jennifer, and Stephanie. He and Marianne reside in Dallas, Texas. As of 2017, they had 15 grandchildren and two great-grandchildren.

Real estate
In 1977, he started a commercial real estate business, The Staubach Company, in partnership with Robert Holloway Jr., an associate of Henry S. Miller. He had prepared by working in the off-seasons from 1970 until 1977 for the Henry S. Miller Company. Staubach began working with real estate because "I couldn't have retired at my age and just played golf. First of all, they didn't pay quarterbacks what they do today. And I was 37 with three kids. I kept thinking about [what would happen] if some linebacker takes off my head and I can't play anymore." He said "Henry Miller Jr. was a lot like [legendary Cowboys coach Tom] Landry. They both had similar haircuts ... they both had phenomenal integrity, great work ethic, and they could transfer their strengths to other people."

The Staubach Company has been his primary endeavor since retirement from football. The company first developed several office buildings; Holloway managed construction while Staubach found tenants. In 1982, Staubach bought out Holloway and shifted the company's emphasis from commercial development to representing corporate clients seeking to lease or buy space. This proved fortuitous as a boom in Dallas office construction followed by a recession in the Texas oil industry left the city with excess office space, so companies representing tenants wielded greater influence. The company has worked with major businesses including AT&T, McDonald's Corporation, Hospital Corporation of America and K Mart Corporation. The company was also involved with residential development, with ownership stakes in 27 apartments and other real estate projects in the Dallas-Fort Worth area. Some of these were in partnership with Cowboys teammate Bob Breunig through S.B.C. Development Corporation, then a subsidiary of the Staubach Company. Others were collaborations with local developers and investors, including Ross Perot. He served as its chairman and CEO until June 20, 2007, when he announced he would resign as CEO of the multibillion-dollar real estate company he started 30 years earlier.

On July 11, 2008, The Staubach Company was sold to Jones Lang LaSalle for $613 million. Staubach and his children's trust would gross more than $100 million from the sale by 2013. The sale provided an initial payment of $9.27 per Staubach share with additional payments due during the ensuing five years for a total of approximately $29/share. Staubach took half of his first payment in Jones Lang LaSalle stock which was then trading at approximately $59.50/share. Staubach served as executive chairman of the Americas region of Jones Lang LaSalle until his retirement in 2018.

Other
During the 1970s and early 1980s, he was a spokesperson for the men's clothing retailer Anderson Little, appearing in both print and television advertisements. Later, he did television advertisements for Rolaids as well.

During the early 1980s, Staubach worked for a brief time as a color commentator for CBS Sports' NFL telecasts. On November 9, 1980, during a close game between the New York Giants and the Dallas Cowboys, Staubach broadcast a nostalgic comment by exclaiming he would like to be "right down there in the middle of it". The Cowboys lost 38–35.

Staubach jointly owned Hall of Fame Racing, a NASCAR Nextel Cup Series team, with fellow former Cowboy and hall-of-famer Troy Aikman, which began racing for the 2006 season.

In 2009, Staubach was honored with the "Lombardi Award of Excellence" from the Vince Lombardi Cancer Foundation. The award was created to honor coach Lombardi's legacy, and is awarded annually to an individual who exemplifies the "spirit" of the coach.

On December 27, 2011, Staubach wrote the foreword for a book titled The Power in a Link, published by John Wiley & Sons, authored by United States Military Academy graduate, David Gowel.

References

External links

Naval Academy profile

1942 births
Living people
All-American college football players
American football quarterbacks
American men's basketball players
American people of German descent
American real estate businesspeople
American Roman Catholics
Basketball players from Cincinnati
Basketball players from Dallas
Businesspeople from Cincinnati
Businesspeople from Dallas
College football announcers
College Football Hall of Fame inductees
Dallas Cowboys players
Heisman Trophy winners
Maxwell Award winners
Military personnel from Cincinnati
Military personnel from Dallas
NASCAR team owners
National Conference Pro Bowl players
National Football League announcers
Navy Midshipmen baseball players
Navy Midshipmen football players
Navy Midshipmen men's basketball players
New Mexico Military Institute Broncos football players
Players of American football from Cincinnati
Players of American football from Dallas
Presidential Medal of Freedom recipients
Pro Football Hall of Fame inductees
Super Bowl MVPs
Texas Republicans
United States Navy officers
United States Navy personnel of the Vietnam War